State Route 317 (SR 317; Lawrenceville–Suwanee Road) is a state highway in the Atlanta metropolitan area of the U.S. state of Georgia.

Route description
SR 317 begins at intersection with SR 120 northwest of Lawrenceville. The route heads northwest to an interchange with Interstate 85 (I-85; Veterans Parkway) in Suwanee. The route continues northwest to its northern terminus with US 23/SR 13 (Buford Highway) in Suwanee.

History

Major intersections

See also

References

317
Transportation in Gwinnett County, Georgia